Alexander Graham Christie (November 19, 1880 – October 24, 1964) was a Canadian/American mechanical engineer and Professor at the Johns Hopkins University, who served as president of the American Society of Mechanical Engineers in 1939-40.

Biography

Youth, education and early career 
Christie was born in Manchester, Ontario, Canada to Peter Christie and Mary Honor (Graham) Christie. He obtained his MSc in mechanical engineering at the School of Practical Science at the University of Toronto in 1901.

After his graduation Christie started as an apprentice in the engineering shop of the Westinghouse Machine Company. After the introduction of its first steam turbine, Christie specialized in that field.

Further career in education and recognition 
By 1909 he was research Assistant in Steam and Gas Engineering at the University of Wisconsin, and Associate Professor of Steam and Gas Engineering by 1914. In 1914 he moved to the Johns Hopkins University, where he became Associate Professor, and later Professor of Engineering until his retirement in 1948, and director the McCoy College until 1953.

In 1939-40 Christie served as president of the American Society of Mechanical Engineers. He was awarded the honorary doctor in engineering by the Stevens Institute of Technology in 1939, and by the Lehigh University in 1940. The American Society for Engineering Education awarded Christie the Lamme Gold Medal in 1948, and the first George Westinghouse Gold Medal for engineering by the ASME in 1953. At the Johns Hopkins Whiting school of Engineer an annual lecture is held on his behalf, the Alexander Graham Christie Lecture.

Selected publications 
 Alexander Graham Christie, Otto Louis Kowalke. Steam and gas engineering laboratory notes, 1912.
 Alexander Graham Christie, What does an engineer do? New York, Wantage Press, 1963.

References

External links 
 Alexander Graham Christie Stock Photos and Pictures, Getty Images

1880 births
1964 deaths
American mechanical engineers
Canadian mechanical engineers
University of Toronto alumni
University of Wisconsin–Madison faculty
Johns Hopkins University faculty
People from Scugog
Presidents of the American Society of Mechanical Engineers
Canadian emigrants to the United States